Josie Aslakson (born September 14, 1995) is an American wheelchair basketball player and a member of the United States women's national wheelchair basketball team. She represented the United States at the 2020 Summer Paralympics.

Career
Aslakson represented the United States at the 2018 Wheelchair Basketball World Championship and finished in sixth place in the tournament. In August 2019 she competed at the 2019 Parapan American Games in the wheelchair basketball tournament and won a silver medal.

Aslakson represented the United States at the 2020 Summer Paralympics in the wheelchair basketball women's tournament and won a bronze medal.

References

1995 births
Living people
Sportspeople from Edina, Minnesota
American women's wheelchair basketball players
Medalists at the 2019 Parapan American Games
Paralympic wheelchair basketball players of the United States
Wheelchair basketball players at the 2020 Summer Paralympics
Medalists at the 2020 Summer Paralympics
Paralympic medalists in wheelchair basketball
Paralympic bronze medalists for the United States
People with paraplegia
Basketball players from Minnesota
21st-century American women